Nekra is a mutant supervillain appearing in American comic books published by Marvel Comics. The character was created by Steve Gerber and Ross Andru for the 1973 comic book Shanna the She-Devil. She is a mutant caused by an atomic explosion at the Los Alamos Proving Grounds, as was the mutant supervillain Mandrill.

Publication history
Nekra first appeared in Shanna the She-Devil #5 (August 1973), and was created by Steve Gerber and Ross Andru.

The character subsequently appears in Marvel Two-In-One #3 (May 1974), Daredevil #109–112 (May–August 1974), Spider-Woman #13–16 (June–July 1979), #50 (June 1983), West Coast Avengers #2 (October 1985), The Vision and the Scarlet Witch #1–2 (October–November 1985), #12 (September 1986), Web of Spider-Man #46 (January 1989), Alpha Flight #79–80 (December 1989–January 1990), Avengers Spotlight #29 (February 1990), Avengers West Coast #65 (December 1990), and the graphic novel Avengers: Death Trap, the Vault (1991). The character does not appear for several years after that, until she reappeared in Witches #1 (August 2004), and The Loners #1 (June 2007), and #4–5 (September–October 2007).

Nekra received entries in the original Official Handbook of the Marvel Universe #8, the Official Handbook of the Marvel Universe Deluxe Edition #9, and the All-New Official Handbook of the Marvel Universe A–Z #8 (2006).

Fictional character biography
Decades ago, Gemma Sinclair was an African-American cleaning lady at Los Alamos National Laboratory. An exploding lab experiment bombards Gemma with radiation, causing her future child to be born a mutant. Nekra is born with fangs and white skin but is not an albino. Loathed by her parents and community, Nekra runs away into the New Mexico desert to live alone when she is 14 years old.

She soon encounters by chance another child who has been mutated by the same explosion. Although his parents were white, he had been born dark-skinned and had developed fur and baboon-like features, for which he had named himself Mandrill. For six years they live by theft and scavenging until they are attacked by a lynch mob that thought they were monsters. While filled with rage, Nekra discovers she is invulnerable to the mob's attacks. Slaying a few of their persecutors, the two escape and come to regard each other as if they were siblings.

The two later travel to Africa as part of the Mandrill's ambitious scheme to overthrow multiple nations through Black Spectre, a cult of personality powered by the Mandrill's pheromonal control over women. This effort is thwarted by Shanna the She-Devil. The two eventually escape, kidnapping Shanna's father in the process and eventually killing him.

Their next plot is of similar means, whereby they use the Mandrill's powers to raise a cult of black women to overthrow America. They are eventually defeated on the White House lawn by Daredevil, the Black Widow, and Shanna. Abandoned by Mandrill, Nekra is captured by authorities.

Nekra is held captive and drugged in a S.H.I.E.L.D. hospital until a subliminal message from Hate-Monger inadvertently gave her the rage necessary to break free. While in the New York sewers, Nekra encounters a cult of Kali, which she persuades that she herself was the reincarnation of Kali. She then moves to the West Coast where she kills and replaces Adrienne Hatros, the reclusive sponsor of an emotional research clinic where Nekra hopes to overcome her own dependency upon emotions. There she develops a drug to subdue feelings of affection and successfully field-tests it, using Spider-Woman as the target of her feelings.

Nekra falls in with the voodoo-master Black Talon as voodoo tutor, and with the Grim Reaper as her lover. When the Grim Reaper dies in combat, Nekra is able to briefly reanimate him as a zombie, so lifelike that even the Grim Reaper does not realize he is dead. When Nekra's love becomes greater than her hate though, the Reaper dies again. Nekra takes his corpse with her, in hopes of reanimating him again.

Nekra then had run-ins with Spider-Man, and then Hank Pym. She also battled Alpha Flight at the behest of Llan the Sorcerer.

Nekra spends some time in the super-villain prison The Vault. During a prison-wide riot, she and Mister Hyde have a brief romantic interlude.

Nekra finally manages to re-animate the Grim Reaper again, but this time there is a caveat: he has to kill one person every 24 hours in order to stay 'alive.' The Reaper chooses Nekra as his first victim and kills her.

Sensing the potential threat of Doctor Druid, Daimon Hellstrom uses his magics to reanimate Nekra and sends her to investigate him. First, she seduces Doctor Druid, which negates his powers, but he manages to regain them via sacrifice. Nekra then shoots Doctor Druid in the forehead, killing him.

Nekra is one of a handful of mutants to have retained her powers in the wake of House of M.

Nekra resurfaces and is seen donating genetic material to an M.G.H ring that had sprung up in L.A. after the death of The Pride. She is defeated by Ricochet, Darkhawk, and the third Spider-Woman. She later returns to the Loners' meeting place to get her revenge on them. Nekra easily battled and defeated all of the Loners and proceeds to strangle Mickey, when she is struck from behind by a mysterious lady named "Namie".

A girl going by the alias Death Reaper makes an appearance in Dark Reign: Zodiac. She claims to be the illegitimate daughter of Nekra.<ref>Dark Reign: Zodiac #1. Marvel Comics.</ref> Nekra joins the Grim Reaper's new Lethal Legion. She and the rest of the Legion are betrayed by Grim Reaper, who uses them as a ploy to give Osborn's Avengers better publicity. She is sent to prison, under the impression that Grim Reaper is dead.

Nekra is seen during the riots in San Francisco with Frenzy of the Acolytes. Both are told by Karma to behave, but Nekra tells her they were promised Utopia and they will never stop hunting mutants. They'll always be hunted, tormented, and killed. She is then blasted by Ms. Marvel. She later takes part in the final battle. Once again pitted against Osborn's Dark Avengers as well as his X-Men, she follows the rest of the mutants to the island of Utopia. It is also revealed that she has a daughter named Death Reaper who is an ally of the villain Zodiac.

During the Chaos War'' storyline, Nekra assists a resurrected Grim Reaper in fighting the Dead Avengers. She was killed with the Grim Reaper when Vision self-destructed.

At some point, Nekra accepted citizenship of the sovereign mutant nation Krakoa. She became involved with Oya. When the two of them killed a bunch of mercenaries who were invading the island by sea, they were sentenced to the Pit of Exile for breaking the "murder no man" law. Arriving in the pit's simulated reality they were greeted by its then-sole resident: Sabretooth, who promised to torture them as practice. While at first he tried to hunt them down, Third-Eye eventually used his powers to break the illusion and convince Victor that they weren't the ones he wanted to hurt, so he changed the illusion to make them all prison cellmates with Professor X and Magneto as the wardens. Victor began working on a plan for them to escape the pit by channeling their consciousnesses through the island so they could manifest themselves on land. He sent everyone up the surface on missions to gather allies to help in their quest, a distrustful Nekra and Oya decided to ignore his request and instead seek out their own ally, Bling!. When a fight between Sabretooth and Melter almost kills everyone in the pit, Nekra and Oya are saved when Third-Eye drags their consciousnesses to the astral plane while Krakoa fixes their bodies. They find themselves in a recreation of Sabretooth's childhood home with him there waiting for them, after having dinner together they all discussed what they did to get thrown in the pit and whether they deserved to be there. Shortly afterwards, they met with Cypher who informed them that Sabretooth had betrayed them and escaped The Pit on his own. He offered them their own releases on two conditions, that they take fellow prisoners Nanny and Orphan-Maker and Toad, who had been hiding back in Sabretooth's Hell where they'd originally entered from and that the assembled team hunts down Sabretooth so he can be punished for his crimes. The team of exiles then sails of on a boat made by Madison Jeffries with Nekra assuring Oya they will never return to Krakoa.

The team tracked Sabretooth to Noble Island, which she and Oya were horrified to discover was a dumping ground for the bodies of mutants experimented on by Orchis. After fighting a super-powered Orchis agent named “The Creation” and losing Orphan-Maker, Sabretooth came on a boat and smugly offered them a ride. After giving Sabretooth a savage beating, in which she noticed his healing factor had stopped working. The team went on a mission to rescue Orphan-Maker from Orchis second base, with Nekra reluctantly acknowledging the necessity of Sabretooth's skills. While there Oya asked why she hadn't used the seed Cypher gave her yet to take Sabretooth back to Krakoa for punishment and she reiterated her distrust for the leaders of Krakoa.Inside the base they found a prison full of mutants and Doctor Barrington's creation came crashing through the wall. Nekra wanted to fight but Sabretooth stopped her, recognising she was running away from something. She explained she'd witnessed Orphan-Maker take his helmet off and seemingly kill Dr. Barrington with one look. Now that his X-Gene was finally activated, Orphan-Maker's immense power was going to kill everyone on the base. With everyone unsure of what to do, Third-Eye took them all back to the Astral Plane.

Powers and abilities
Possesses the ability to increase her strength, endurance, and resistance to pain and injury by harnessing her violent emotions. Her heightened adrenal activity causes a series of metabolic reactions within her body that toughen her skin and increase the efficiency of her muscles. At her peak, she can lift approximately 10 tons, withstand an explosion of about 100 pounds of TNT and extreme degrees of cold and heat. Her powers are limited by how long she can sustain her emotional state, generally for no more than an hour.

References

External links
 Captain Comics' article on Dr Druid

Characters created by Ross Andru
Characters created by Steve Gerber
Comics characters introduced in 1973
Fictional African-American people
Fictional characters from New Mexico
Fictional murderers
Fictional priests and priestesses
Marvel Comics characters who use magic
Marvel Comics characters with superhuman strength
Marvel Comics female supervillains
Marvel Comics mutants